Festival de Guitarra de Barcelona is an annual guitar festival in Barcelona, Spain. It is usually held in several locations in the month of March. The artistic director in 2002 was Ichiro Suzuki.

References

Music festivals in Catalonia
Spring (season) events in Spain